is a wagashi (Japanese confection) made of red bean paste, agar, and sugar. It is usually sold in a block form, and eaten in slices.  There are two main types: neri yōkan and mizu yōkan. "Mizu" means "water", and indicates that it is made with more water than usual. Mizu yōkan is often chilled and eaten in the summer.

Types
This type of yōkan is milky and translucent with a much milder flavour than that made of red bean paste. As such, it can be effectively flavoured and coloured by using green tea powder.

Yōkan may also contain chopped chestnuts, persimmons, whole sweetened azuki beans, figs, and sweet potato (imo yōkan), among other additions. Sugar can also be replaced with honey, dark brown sugar, or molasses to alter the taste of the yōkan produced. There is also shio yōkan, which uses small amounts of salt.

History
Originally a Chinese jelly from the gelatin derived from boiling sheep, the term "yōkan" literally means “sheep geng” (羊 sheep + 羹 thick soup).
It was introduced to Japan by Zen Buddhists in the Kamakura and Muromachi periods, around 1191. As Buddhism forbids killing, they replaced the animal gelatin with wheat flour and azuki beans. Agar came into use after it was discovered around 1658, in Japan. This variation became the basis of modern yōkan.
One of the most popular Japanese sweets, it evolved further during the Edo period as sugar became more available. It can be stored for long periods of time without refrigeration unless opened, and is a staple gift item.

See also
 Gelatin dessert
 Uirō
 Karukan

References

Jams and jellies
Wagashi
Buddhist cuisine